Ethan Suplee (born May 25, 1976) is an American film and television actor. He is best known for his roles in the films American History X, Remember the Titans,  John Q, The Wolf of Wall Street, Without a Paddle, and several of Kevin Smith's films as well as Frankie in Boy Meets World and Randy Hickey in My Name Is Earl.

Early life
Suplee was born in Manhattan, the son of Debbie and Bill Suplee (who later played Willie the One Eyed Mailman in My Name Is Earl). His parents were actors who met while performing summer stock theater and appeared on Broadway. On the Your Welcome show, Ethan stated that he dropped out of school at age 14.

Career
The first major role Suplee landed was as Willam in Mallrats, directed by Kevin Smith, alongside future My Name is Earl costar Jason Lee.  He also appeared briefly in the independent View Askew-produced Drawing Flies. Smith cast both Suplee and Lee again in later films Chasing Amy and Dogma.  They both make cameos in Clerks II.  At the same time as the filming of Mallrats, Suplee also had a recurring role as Frankie "The Enforcer" Stechino in Boy Meets World, from 1994 to 1998. Suplee's dramatic performances include the roles of the ruthless white power skinhead Seth in American History X, one of three men who rape a clown in Vulgar, Ashton Kutcher's goth college roommate "Thumper" in The Butterfly Effect, American football player Louie Lastik in Remember the Titans, Johnny Depp's buddy and initial drug-dealing partner Tuna in Blow, and the simpleminded Pangle in Cold Mountain. Suplee also had a cameo in the HBO TV series Entourage in the fictional movie Queens Boulevard. In 2014, he was cast in the TV Land original sitcom Jennifer Falls, which reunited him with My Name Is Earl co-star, Jaime Pressly.

In 2016, Suplee started playing D in Hulu's series Chance, as well as police officer Billy "Beer Pong" Tompkins on the Netflix sitcom The Ranch.

Personal life
In March 2011, Suplee was featured on TMZ on TV, having lost over 200 pounds in body weight. He was quoted as crediting cycling for his fit frame, explaining "I ride road bikes, I ride bicycles." He once reached an all-time low of 9% body fat, but put some of the weight back on upon realizing that his weight had been a past source of acting opportunities. Suplee is also good friends with Stza of Star Fucking Hipsters and he agreed to appear in their music video for the song "3000 Miles Away" from their album Never Rest in Peace. He is a Scientologist. Since 2006, he has been married to Brandy Lewis, the younger sister of actress and singer Juliette Lewis.

Filmography

Film

Television

Music video

Video games

Awards and nominations

References

External links
 

1976 births
Living people
20th-century American male actors
21st-century American male actors
Male actors from New York City
American male film actors
American Scientologists
American male television actors
American male voice actors
People from Manhattan